USNS Newport (T-EPF-12) is the twelfth  and is operated by the United States Navys Military Sealift Command. It is the fourth ship in naval service named after Newport, Rhode Island.

On 20 February 2020, USNS Newport was launched at Austal USA in Mobile, Alabama. The Newport completed sea trials on 30 July 2020 and its delivery was accepted by the U.S. Navy on 2 September 2020.

References

Transports of the United States Navy
Ships built in Mobile, Alabama
Spearhead-class Joint High Speed Vessels
2020 ships